Adarnase Shavliani was the King of Abkhazia between 880 and 887. He succeeded his father, the usurper John Shavliani, to the throne but was deposed and put to death by Bagrat I, the son of Demetrius II.

The name Adarnase derives from Middle Persian Ādurnarsēh, with the second component of the word (Nase) being the Georgian attestation of the Middle Persian name Narseh, which ultimately derives from Avestan nairyō.saŋya-. The Middle Persian name Narseh also exists in Georgian as Nerse. The name Ādurnarsēh appears in the Armenian language as Atrnerseh.

See also 

Divan of the Abkhazian Kings

References 

9th-century Kings of Abkhazia
880s deaths
Year of birth unknown
9th-century murdered monarchs